The Eddie Mae Herron Center & Museum is a historic community building at 1708 Archer Street in Pocahontas, Arkansas. Originally built as an African Methodist Episcopal Church and known as St. Mary's AME Church, it is a small one-room wood-frame structure, with a gable roof and novelty siding.  A flat-roof addition expands the building to the right.  The main facade has two entrances, each sheltered by a small gable-roofed hood.  The building was built in 1918, to provide facilities for a church and school to the small African-American community in Pocahontas.  It served as a church for thirty years, and as a school known as Pocahontas Colored School for fifty, and was later adapted for other uses, most recently as a museum and community center.

The building was listed on the National Register of Historic Places in 2002 as the St. Mary's AME Church—Pocahontas Colored School.  It was a one-room schoolhouse.

See also
National Register of Historic Places listings in Randolph County, Arkansas

References

External links
 Official website

African Methodist Episcopal churches in Arkansas
Schools in Randolph County, Arkansas
Churches on the National Register of Historic Places in Arkansas
School buildings on the National Register of Historic Places in Arkansas
One-room schoolhouses in Arkansas
Churches completed in 1918
Museums in Randolph County, Arkansas
African-American museums in Arkansas
National Register of Historic Places in Randolph County, Arkansas